Coas is a commune in Maramureș County, Romania. It is composed of two villages, Coaș and Întrerâuri. These were part of Săcălășeni Commune between 1968 and 2004, when they were split off to recreate a separate commune.

References

Communes in Maramureș County